Trumpetflower  or trumpet flower may refer to several plants:
 Chinese trumpet flower, Incarvillea, native to central and eastern Asia
 Evening trumpetflower, Gelsemium sempervirens, native to North America
 Indian trumpetflower, Oroxylum indicum, native to India
 Velvet trumpet flower, Salpiglossis sinuata, native to Chile
 Wavy trumpet flower, Dolichandrone atrovirens, native to India

See also
 Angel's trumpet, plants with trumpet-like flowers
 Bugleweed
 Cat-claw trumpet, or cat's claw creeper, Dolichandra unguis-cati
 Desert trumpet, Eriogonum inflatum
 Devil's trumpet, Datura metel
 Flaming trumpet, Collomia rawsoniana
 Golden trumpet, Allamanda cathartica
 Mysore trumpet vine, Thunbergia mysorensis
 Orange trumpet, Pyrostegia venusta
 Pink trumpet vine
 Podranea
 Tecomanthe burungu
 Tiny trumpet, Collomia linearis
 Trumpet pitcher, Sarracenia
 Trumpet stylewort, Levenhookia leptantha
 Trumpet tree, several plants
 Trumpet weed:
 Eutrochium fistulosum
 Eutrochium purpureum
 Trumpet vine or trumpet creeper, Campsis
 Water trumpet, Cryptocoryne